Saint Dwynwen, sometimes known as Dwyn or Donwen, is the Welsh patron saint of lovers. She is celebrated throughout Wales on 25 January.

History and legend

The original tale has become mixed with elements of folktales and Celtic stories, and so there are a number of variations on the tale. Dwynwen is believed to have been a daughter of King Brychan Brycheiniog, who lived in the 5th century; her mother may have been Rigrawst. Dwynwen lived in Anglesey.

In the tale told of her, either a young man named Maelon Dafodrill falls in love with her, but she rejects his advances; or she is unable to marry him because her father forbade the marriage and had already promised her to someone else. Distraught over her love for Maelon, Dwynwen prayed she would fall out of love with him. An angel provides her with a potion; Maelon turns to ice. God then grants her three requests: that Maelon be released; that, through her, God look after all true lovers; and that she remain unmarried. As a mark of her thanks, she then retreats to the solitude of Ynys Llanddwyn off the west coast of Anglesey to become a hermit until her death, in about AD 460; although it has been written in some texts that she had fled there because of her fear of Maelgwn Gwynedd.

Dwynwen reportedly studied the healing properties of local herbs and thus was able to cure many illnesses of people who sought her from all over Wales.

Ynys Llanddwyn

Dwynwen withdrew to a small tidal island off the southwest coast of Anglesey. (Newborough is the closest town.) There she built a church; which became known as Llanddwyn ("Church of Dwynwen"). Its remains can still be seen on Ynys Llanddwyn.

Veneration

St Dwynwen's Church on Ynys Llanddwyn became an important shrine during the Middle Ages. The holy well became a site of pilgrimage, at which the movement of sacred fish within its waters was believed to indicate lovers' destinies. Welsh poets Dafydd ap Gwilym and Dafydd Trefor wrote of the saint and the pilgrims who visited Ynys Llanddwyn. 

Following the Reformation, devotions at her shrine were suppressed, and the site itself quickly fell into disrepair through the effects of numerous sandstorms. Those pilgrims who still came to pray in the area visited Saint Elian's Well instead. During the nineteenth century, the Anglican Church rediscovered traditional devotions, in the course of which in the 'sixtieth year of Queen Victoria', probably 1879, a plain cross about fourteen feet (4.2m) high was erected in memory of Dwynwen.

In 1903, a Celtic cross was erected near the ruins of the church by the Hon. F. G. Wynn of Glynllivon, son of the 3rd Baron Newborough, also in memory of its patroness. The site is now part of a nature reserve.

Patronage
She is also the patron saint of sick animals.

Dydd Santes Dwynwen

 (Welsh for St Dwynwen's Day) is considered to be the Welsh equivalent to Valentine's Day and is celebrated on 25 January. It celebrates Dwynwen, the Welsh saint of lovers.'Calendars from the fifteenth century and later give 25 January as the day commemorating St Dwynwen in Wales. Nicolas Roscarrok, however, gives as her day 13 July, and opines that 'St Dwin' is the same as 'Dwinwen'. In his Calendar he gives 25 January as the day of 'Dwinwent' or 'Damwent'.

St Dwynwen is not officially commemorated in the liturgies of the Catholic or Anglican Churches, but is in the Orthodox Church, being listed both under Eastern Orthodox Liturgics and Latin Saints of the Roman Patriarchate sites; she does not appear in the 2004 edition of the Roman Martyrology, nor the Roman Catholic calendar for Wales, nor the 1995 revision of the Church in Wales calendar.

Present day
During the 1960s, a student at University College, Bangor, Vera Williams, sought to revive the observance of St Dwynwen's Day by commissioning four designs for St Dwynwen's Day cards, in the style of a "Welsh Valentine's Day". Local press adopted the idea, and by 2004 the celebration of 25 January as a festival for Welsh lovers was so well established that even Gwynedd Council was promoting it.
 
The popularity and celebration of St Dwynwen's day has increased considerably in recent years, with special events, such as concerts and parties, often held and the exchange of Dydd Santes Dwynwen greetings cards. Though still not as popular as St Valentine's Day in February, St Dwynwen is becoming better-known among today's Welsh population. A big boost for St Dwynwen's Day came in 2003 when the Welsh Language Board teamed up with UK supermarket Tesco to distribute 50,000 free cards in 43 of its Welsh stores. One card was inserted with a special heart, the finder of which would be entitled to a prize. The board also suggested numerous ways to celebrate the feast besides sending cards, for example, organize a love-themed gig, set up a singles night, prepare a romantic meal and perhaps compose a love poem to read at the local pub.

Legacy
Her name is still recalled in place names such as Ynys Llanddwyn and Porthddwyn on Anglesey in Wales and the church of Sen Adhwynn'' in Advent, Cornwall.

Benjamin Williams wrote "Dwynwen", a chorus for male voices with music by Welsh composer Joseph Parry, for the 1896 Llandudno National Eisteddfod.

See also
 Adwen, the related Cornish saint

References

External links
 St Fagans National History Museum page on St Dwynwen's Day
 Celebrating Diwrnod Santes Dwynwen with your loved one
 St Dwynwen's Day
 St. Dwynwen at catholic.org
 

5th-century Christian saints
5th-century Welsh people
5th-century Welsh women
Children of Brychan
Days celebrating love
Welsh mythology
Welsh Roman Catholic saints